A court of summary jurisdiction can mean any court that exercises summary jurisdiction:

usually, a magistrates' court
or, very specifically, the Court of Summary Jurisdiction (Northern Territory of Australia)